Events from the year 1811 in Denmark.

Incumbents
 Monarch – Frederick VI
 Prime minister – Frederik Moltke

Events

 3 March  Sparekassen Bikuben is founded in Copenhagen.
 27 March – The Battle of Anholt during the Gunboat War.
 30 June  Hassel & Teudt is founded in Copenhagen.

Undated
 Christiani & Grisson is founded.

Births
 23 April – Carl Ferdinand Allen, historian (died 1871)
 16 August – Adam August Müller, painter (died 1844)
 2 September – J. C. Jacobsen, brewer, industrialist, founder of Carlsberg (died 1887)
 23 November – Elise Holst, stage actress (died 1891)
 4 December – Martin Hammerich, literary historian and educator (died 1881)
 31 December – Moritz Unna, photographer (died 1871)

Deaths
 4 September – Frédéric de Coninck, merchant, ship owner (born 1740)
 26 September – Cathrine Marie Møller, artist (born 1744)
 12 October – Thomas Potter, industrialist (born 1745)

References

 
1810s in Denmark
Denmark
Years of the 19th century in Denmark